Habel Satya (born 12 September 1987 in Wamena, Papua) is an Indonesian football midfielder who can operate as winger as well. He is known for his acceleration, pace, and agility in the field. He currently plays for Persiwa Wamena.

Career statistics
As of 27 June 2012.

References

External links
Profile Habel Satya at Liga-Indonesia.co.id
Profile Habel Satya at Persiwa-mania.blogspot.com

Indonesian footballers
1987 births
Living people
Indonesian Christians
Liga 1 (Indonesia) players
People from Wamena
Indonesian Premier Division players
Association football midfielders